The Lord Lieutenant of Ross and Cromarty, is the British monarch's personal representative in an area which has been defined since 1975 as consisting of the local government districts of Ross and Cromarty and Skye and Lochalsh in Scotland, and this definition was renewed by the Lord-Lieutenants (Scotland) Order 1996. Previously, the area of the lieutenancy was the county of Ross and Cromarty, which was abolished as a local government area by the Local Government (Scotland) Act 1973. The districts were created, under the 1973 act as districts of the two-tier Highland region and abolished as local government areas under the Local Government (Scotland) Act 1994, which turned the Highland region into a unitary council area.

Prior to 1891 there had been a separate Lord Lieutenant of Ross and a Lord Lieutenant of Cromarty, but these were merged by the Local Government (Scotland) Act 1889.

List of Lord-Lieutenants of Ross and Cromarty 
 Mackenzie had been Lord Lieutenant of Ross-shire
 Sir Kenneth Mackenzie, 6th Baronet 15 May 1891 – 1899
 Sir Hector Munro, 11th Baronet 7 July 1899 – 15 December 1935
 Sir Hector Mackenzie, 8th Baronet 24 April 1936 – 1955
 Sir Richard O'Connor 3 November 1955 – 1964
 Sir John Stirling 29 August 1964 – 1968
 Alexander Francis Matheson 9 October 1968 – 20 August 1976
 Sir John Hayes 1 February 1977 – 1988
 Sir Roderick Stirling 29 June 1988 – 2007
 Janet Bowen 2 June 2007 – July 2019
Joanie Whiteford July 2019 – present

Vice Lieutenants 
Colonel James Alexander Stewart-Mackenzie 22 March 1900

References and external links
Website of the Lord-Lieutenant of Ross and Cromarty

Ross and Cromarty
Lord-Lieutenants of Ross and Cromarty
1891 establishments in Scotland